The Shuijiahu–Bengbu railway is a freight railway line in China.

History 
In 2010, a project to upgrade and electrify the line was started.

On 1 November 2018, work began to reroute the railway in Bengbu. The line was diverted along the southeastern edge of the city, away from the centre. The line reopened on 22 December 2020.

Route 
The line leaves the Huainan railway at Shuijiahu railway station and heads north. It joins the Beijing–Shanghai railway at Bengbu East railway station

References 

Railway lines in China
Transport in Anhui